Älvdalen Municipality (Elfdalian: Kommun Övdaln) is a municipality in Dalarna County in central Sweden. Its seat is located in the town of Älvdalen.

The two parishes Särna and Idre were ceded to Sweden from Norway under the treaty of Brömsebro on 13 August 1645. In 1971 the three municipalities Särna, Idre (which itself had been split off from Särna in 1916) and Älvdalen were amalgamated to form the present municipality.

Älvdalen literally means River Valley, a name stemming from the area around the town Älvdalen, situated along the Österdal River, in the municipality's southern part.

The middle part of the coat of arms is meant to depict the landscape: streams and hills.

Geography 
Geographically, it is considered divided into three parts. From north to south: the mountainous (fjäll) part, the forest part, and the valley (Älv) part.

North 
The northern part is located within the Scandinavian mountain range. It has cultural influences from the native Sámi people.

Idre, with about 800 inhabitants is a notable skiing resort.

This part has some high mountains including Storvätteshågna at 1,204 meters and Städjan at 1,131 m. The Töfsingdalen National Park is also located in the northernmost parts.

The Northern part is the northernmost point of Svealand, one of the three crowns under the Swedish throne.

Central 
The forest part has forests, with the national park Fulufjället also belonging to this part. Its influences come from it bordering to Norway, and its history has many examples and remains from its border conflicts. To symbolize this, the lower part of the coat of arms depict a crossbow. The point furthest away from any seas in Scandinavia is located here.

The town Särna is located along the Österdal River, with 930 inhabitants. Like Idre, its main industry is tourism. The town once belonged to Norway, but in 1644 it was occupied by 200 Swedish peasants, which in effect made it a Swedish town, although it was official granted first with new borders of 1751.

South 
The southern area is populated by 5,000 persons, of whom most speak or understand the Elfdalian (or Övdalsk, Älvdalsmål) dialect/language, which is very different from standard Swedish.

This area may be said to have the most interesting culture, with the town Älvdalen and several notable villages such as Evertsberg, Blyberg, Klitten, Brunnsberg, Västermyckeläng and Åsen.

Localities

Riksdag elections

References

External links

Älvdalen Municipality – Official site
Bunriks fire watch tower

Municipalities of Dalarna County
1644 establishments in Sweden